Wanda von Sacher-Masoch (née Angelika Aurora Rümelin; 14 March 1845, in Graz –  spring 1933 in Paris) was an Austrian writer and translator, best remembered for her novel translated by Georges Ohnet from French into German titled Das Recht des Kindes (1894), and the posthumous publication The Confessions of Wanda von Sacher-Masoch (1990). She often wrote under the pseudonyms Wanda von Dunajew and D. Dolorès.

References 

1845 births
1933 deaths
Austrian writers
Austrian translators